Ghunghat is a 1960 Hindi drama movie directed by Ramanand Sagar and produced by S.S. Vasan from Gemini Studios. The film stars Bharat Bhushan, Pradeep Kumar, Bina Rai, Asha Parekh, Leela Chitnis, Rajendranath, Rehman and Agha. It is an adaptation of Rabindranath Tagore's 1906 Bengali story Noukadubi (The Wreck). The film's music is by Ravi, while the songs were penned by Shakeel Badayuni.  The film became a hit at the box office. Musically also, it was liked by the audience. "Laage Na Mora Jiya" and "Mori Chham Chham Baje Payaliya" sung by Lata Mangeshkar were hit songs from the film.

At the 8th Filmfare Awards, Bina Rai won the Filmfare Award for Best Actress for her performance in Ghunghat.

Cast
 Bharat Bhushan as Dr. Gopal
 Pradeep Kumar as Ravi
 Bina Rai as Parvati / Jamna
 Asha Parekh as Laxmi
 Rehman as Manohar 
 Minoo Mumtaz as Saroj
 Agha as Ram Swaroop 
 Leela Chitnis as Laxmi's Mother
 Kanhaiyalal as Saroj's Father
 Rajendranath as Lali
 Helen as Dancer
 Pratima Devi as Gopal's Mother

Songs

Awards and nominations
The film created an upset at the 8th Filmfare Awards when it won the Filmfare Award for Best Actress for Rai instead of Madhubala, who gave a critically acclaimed performance in Mughal-e-Azam (1960). The Hindu severely criticized Filmfare for its selection.
Filmfare Award for Best ActressBina Rai
 Nominated - Filmfare Award for Best Supporting ActorAgha

References

External links 
 

Films scored by Ravi
1960 films
1960s Hindi-language films
Films based on works by Rabindranath Tagore
Gemini Studios films
Films based on Indian novels